Abdolabad-e Pain (also Romanized as ‘Abdolābād-e Pā’īn; also known as ‘Abdollāhābād and ‘Abbdollāhābād) is a village in Jafarabad Rural District, Jafarabad District, Qom County, Qom Province, Iran. At the 2006 census, its population was 19, in 4 families.

References 

Populated places in Qom Province